Joe McNulty (born September 9, 1949) is an American cross-country skier. He competed in the men's 50 kilometre event at the 1972 Winter Olympics.

References

External links
 

1949 births
Living people
American male cross-country skiers
Olympic cross-country skiers of the United States
Cross-country skiers at the 1972 Winter Olympics
Sportspeople from Chicago